Djelida District is a district of Aïn Defla Province, Algeria.

Municipalities
The district is further divided into three municipalities.
Djelida
Bouchared
Djemaa Ouled Cheikh

Districts of Aïn Defla Province